Go Seul-ki (born 21 April 1986) is a South Korean footballer who plays for Port in the Thai League 1. His previous clubs were Buriram United, El Jaish, Ulsan Hyundai, Gwangju Sangmu and Pohang Steelers.

Career statistics

Honours
Pohang Steelers
Korean League Cup (1): 2009

Ulsan Hyundai
 AFC Champions League (1): 2012
Korean League Cup (1): 2011

El Jaish SC
 Qatar Crown Prince Cup (1): 2014
 Qatari Stars Cup (1): 2012-13

Buriram United
Thai Premier League (2): 2015, 2017
Thai FA Cup (1): 2015
Thai League Cup (2): 2015, 2016
Kor Royal Cup (1): 2015
Mekong Club Championship (2): 2015, 2016

Port
Thai FA Cup (1): 2019

References

External links 
 
https://us.soccerway.com/players/sul-ki-go/26970/

1986 births
Living people
Association football forwards
South Korean footballers
South Korean expatriate footballers
Pohang Steelers players
Ulsan Hyundai FC players
Gimcheon Sangmu FC players
El Jaish SC players
Go Seul-ki
K League 1 players
Go Seul-ki
Qatar Stars League players
Expatriate footballers in Qatar
South Korean expatriate sportspeople in Qatar
Expatriate footballers in Thailand
South Korean expatriate sportspeople in Thailand
Footballers from Seoul